The West Country Men were a group of influential individuals in Elizabethan England who advocated the English colonisation of Munster, attacks on the Spanish Empire, and the expansion of the English Empire. The group included Humphrey Gilbert, Walter Raleigh, Sir Francis Drake, John Hawkins, Sir Richard Grenville, and Ralph Lane. Five of these individuals originated in the southwest region of England known as the West Country, and were particularly associated with the sea ports of Devon, especially Plymouth.

References

Elizabethan era
People of Elizabethan Ireland
British Empire
Advocates of colonization